Bradley Alfson Sanfilippo (born January 3, 1975) is an American college baseball coach, currently serving as head coach at San Jose State. Sanfilippo played college baseball at De Anza and UC Davis.

Sanfilippo was a high school baseball coach in Los Gatos and San Jose, California before moving up to the college level as a volunteer assistant at California in 2010. From 2013 to 2014, he was an assistant coach at San Jose State, before coming back to California as assistant from 2015 to 2017. After spending the 2018 season as interim head coach at San Jose State, Sanfilippo was promoted to the job long term.

Playing career
A native of Los Gatos, California, Sanfilippo graduated from Los Gatos High School in 1993. An outfielder and designated hitter, Sanfilippo began his college baseball career at De Anza College before transferring to UC Davis before his sophomore year. As a senior at UC Davis in 1998, Sanfilippo was a team captain and batted .308 with 37 hits and 19 RBI.

Coaching career
Sanfilippo returned to Los Gatos High School as an assistant coach in 1999. In 2002, Sanfilippo was director of baseball operations at Santa Clara. In 2003, he was named the head coach at Willow Glen High School. From 2004 to 2009, Sanfilippo served as the head coach of Los Gatos. Sanfilippo also taught eighth grade English at Willow Glen Middle School in San Jose for seven years.

In September 2009, Sanfilippo became a volunteer assistant coach at California. The recruiting coordinator and third base coach under David Esquer, Sanfilippo would remain at California for three seasons, including California's run to the 2011 College World Series.

Under Dave Nakama, Sanfilippo was an assistant coach at San Jose State from 2013 to 2014. He spent a second stint at California as assistant coach from 2015 to 2017.

In January 2018, Sanfilippo returned to San Jose State as interim head coach, after regular head coach Jason Hawkins was placed on leave before eventually resigning. After posting a 27–30 record and third place in the Mountain West Conference, Sanfilippo signed a five-year contract on June 12, 2018 with San Jose State to be head baseball coach.

Head coaching record

See also
 List of current NCAA Division I baseball coaches

References

External links
San Jose State Spartans bio

1975 births
Living people
Baseball outfielders
De Anza Dons baseball players
UC Davis Aggies baseball players
High school baseball coaches in the United States
Santa Clara Broncos baseball coaches
California Golden Bears baseball coaches 
San Jose State Spartans baseball coaches
People from Los Gatos, California
Baseball designated hitters
Baseball players from San Francisco
Sportspeople from Santa Clara County, California
Baseball coaches from California
Schoolteachers from California